Nick Fulwood (born 2 October 1963) is a retired British tennis player who reached the third round of the 1989 Wimbledon Championships, where he defeated Jonathan Canter and compatriot Mark Petchey before losing to Paul Chamberlin.

References

External links 
 
 

English tennis coaches
1963 births
Living people
Place of birth missing (living people)
English male tennis players
People from Risley, Derbyshire
Tennis people from Derbyshire
British male tennis players